Grayrigg is a civil parish in the South Lakeland District of Cumbria, England.  It contains eleven listed buildings that are recorded in the National Heritage List for England.  Of these, one is listed at Grade II*, the middle of the three grades, and the others are at Grade II, the lowest grade.  The parish is almost entirely rural, the only significant settlement being the village of Grayrigg.  The listed buildings include houses, farmhouses, farm buildings, bridges, milestones, a church, and a disused railway viaduct.


Key

Buildings

See also

Listed buildings in Whinfell
Listed buildings in Tebay
Listed buildings in Sedbergh
Listed buildings in Firbank
Listed buildings in Lambrigg
Listed buildings in Docker

References

Citations

Sources

Lists of listed buildings in Cumbria